The 2019 Nigerian Senate election in Adamawa State was held on February 23, 2019, to elect members of the Nigerian Senate to represent Adamawa State. Binos Dauda Yaroe representing Adamawa South and Ishaku Elisha Abbo representing Adamawa North won on the platform of Peoples Democratic Party, while Aishatu Dahiru Ahmed representing Adamawa Central won on the platform of All Progressives Congress.

Overview

Summary

Results

Adamawa South 
A total of 13 candidates registered with the Independent National Electoral Commission to contest in the election. PDP candidate Binos Dauda Yaroe won the election, defeating APC Abubakar Ahmad Mdallahyidi and 11 other party candidates. Yaroe scored 144,403 votes, while  APC candidate scored 118,129 votes.

Adamawa Central 
A total of 12 candidates registered with the Independent National Electoral Commission to contest in the election. APC candidate Aishatu Dahiru Ahmed won the election, defeating PDP candidate Modibbo Murtala Mohammed and 10 other party candidates. Ahmed pulled 188,526 votes, while PDP candidate Murtala Chibado scored 96,530 and African Democratic Congress (ADC) candidate Mustafa Madawaki scored 36,030.

Adamawa North 
A total of 15 candidates registered with the Independent National Electoral Commission to contest in the election. PDP candidate Ishaku Elisha Cliff Abbo won the election, defeating APC candidate and incumbent senator, Binta Garba. Abbo pulled 79,337 votes while his closest rival Binta Garba pulled 63,119 votes.

References 

Adamawa State senatorial elections
2019 Adamawa State elections